South Wentworthville is a predominantly residential suburb in Greater Western Sydney, in the state of New South Wales, Australia.

Geography 
South Wentworthville is located 26 kilometres west of the Sydney central business district, in the local government area of the Cumberland Council and is part of the Greater Western Sydney region. South Wentworthville is an extension of Wentworthville.

Transport infrastructure 
 Liverpool–Parramatta T-way – a bus-route that passes through South Wentworthville
 M4 cycleway – a cyclist and pedestrian path that connects South Wentworthville to Sydney Olympic Park

Notable residents 
 Rick Springfield was born in South Wentworthville.
 Channel Seven newsreader, Chris Bath, grew up in the suburb and worked at nearby Kmart Merrylands.

See also 
 List of Sydney suburbs

References 

Suburbs of Sydney
Cumberland Council, New South Wales